Gather the Daughters is a 2017 science-fiction novel by Jennie Melamed. The novel received positive reviews and was nominated for the 2018 Arthur C. Clarke Award.

References

External links
 Book information on Goodreads

2017 American novels
2017 science fiction novels
American science fiction novels
Little, Brown and Company books